Gaocheng is a town of Wanzai County in northwestern Jiangxi province, China, located about  due west of the county seat. , it administers Gaocheng Street Residential Neighborhood and the following 13 villages:
Gaocheng Village
Liansheng Village
Qiaoxi Village
Shaotian Village
Qifeng Village
Nanmiao Village
Taoyuan Village
Meiyuan Village
Lishan Village
Daping Village
Tuanjie Village
Guyuan Village
Fusheng Village

See also 
 List of township-level divisions of Jiangxi

References 

Wanzai County
Township-level divisions of Jiangxi